Comana miltogramma is a moth of the family Limacodidae. It is found in Australia.

References

Moths described in 1891
Limacodidae
Moths of Australia
Taxa named by Edward Meyrick